The Achelous ( Akhelôios), also Acheloos, is a river of the district of Malis in ancient Thessaly, flowing past the town of Paracheloïtae, and near Lamia; a tributary of the Spercheios.

References

Rivers of Thessaly
Geography of ancient Thessaly
Malis (region)
Rivers of Greece